In mathematics, specifically in order theory and functional analysis, an abstract m-space or an AM-space is a Banach lattice  whose norm satisfies  for all x and y in the positive cone of X. 
such an element u is unique and an order unit of X.

Examples 

The strong dual of an AL-space is an AM-space with unit.

If X is an Archimedean ordered vector lattice, u is an order unit of X, and pu is the Minkowski functional of  then the complete of the semi-normed space (X, pu) is an AM-space with unit u.

Properties 

Every AM-space is isomorphic (as a Banach lattice) with some closed vector sublattice of some suitable . 
The strong dual of an AM-space with unit is an AL-space. 

See also 

 Vector lattice
 AL-space

References

Bibliography

  

Functional analysis